Darrah is an unincorporated community in Hale County, Alabama, United States.

Notes

Unincorporated communities in Hale County, Alabama
Unincorporated communities in Alabama